Maura Forte (born 1 November 1959 in Villata) is an Italian politician.

She is a member of the Democratic Party and she was elected Mayor of Vercelli on 8 June 2014 and took office on 11 June. Forte ran for a second term at the 2019 local elections, but lost at the second round to former mayor Andrea Corsaro.

See also
2014 Italian local elections
List of mayors of Vercelli

References

External links
 
 

1959 births
Living people
Mayors of Vercelli
Democratic Party (Italy) politicians